The 2024 United States presidential election in Iowa is scheduled to take place on Tuesday, November 5, 2024, as part of the 2024 United States elections in which all 50 states plus the District of Columbia will participate. Iowa voters will choose electors to represent them in the Electoral College via a popular vote. The state of Iowa has six electoral votes in the Electoral College, following reapportionment due to the 2020 United States census in which the state neither gained nor lost a seat.

Incumbent Democratic president Joe Biden has stated that he intends to run for reelection to a second term.

Caucuses

Republican caucus

The Iowa Republican caucuses will he held on February 5, 2024.

Democratic caucus
The Iowa caucuses operate very differently from primary elections used by most other states (see U.S. presidential primary). The caucuses are generally defined as "gatherings of neighbors". Rather than going to polls and casting ballots, Iowans gather at a set location in each of Iowa's precincts. Typically, these meetings occur in schools, churches, public libraries, or even individuals' houses. Caucuses are held quadrennially, during the presidential election seasons.

The rules of the caucus process to determine delegates to national conventions are determined by the party and differ substantially from cycle to cycle. The district caucuses select delegates to district conventions, who in turn select delegates to the state convention, who at last select those to the National Convention.

Caucus polling
With Biden

Without Biden

General election

Polling
Donald Trump vs. Joe Biden

See also 
 United States presidential elections in Iowa
 2024 United States presidential election
 2024 Democratic Party presidential primaries
 2024 Republican Party presidential primaries
 2024 United States elections

Notes 

Partisan clients

References 

Iowa
2024
Presidential